Antsatsaka is a municipality in Madagascar. It belongs to the district of Ambanja, which is a part of Diana Region. According to 2001 census the population of Antsatsaka was 10,214.

Primary and junior level secondary education are available in town. The majority 98% of the population are farmers.  The most important crop is cocoa, while other important products are banana, coffee and oranges.  Additionally fishing employs 2% of the population.

References and notes 

Populated places in Diana Region